Olav Aarna (born 4 November 1942, Tallinn) is an Estonian computer scientist, academic and politician. He was a member of X Riigikogu. Aarna was the rector of Tallinn University of Technology from 1991 until 2000, and the rector of the Estonian Business School from 2000 until 2003.

Aarna's father was oil shale chemist and university rector Agu Aarna. He has been a member of Res Publica Party.

References

Living people
1942 births
Estonian computer scientists
Res Publica Party politicians
Members of the Riigikogu, 2003–2007
Rectors of universities in Estonia
Tallinn University of Technology alumni
Academic staff of the Tallinn University of Technology
Recipients of the Order of the National Coat of Arms, 4th Class
Scientists from Tallinn
Politicians from Tallinn